The following is a list of countries and territories where English is an official language—that is, a language used in citizen interactions with government officials. , there were 58 sovereign states and 28 non-sovereign entities where English was an official language. Many administrative divisions have declared English an official language at the local or regional level.

Most states where English is an official language are former territories of the British Empire. Exceptions include Rwanda and Burundi, which were formerly German and then Belgian colonies; Cameroon, where only part of national territory was under British mandate; and Liberia, the Philippines, the Federated States of Micronesia, the Marshall Islands, and Palau, which were American territories. English is the sole official language of the Commonwealth of Nations and of the Association of Southeast Asian Nations (ASEAN). English is one of the official languages of the United Nations, the European Union, NAFTA, the African Union, the Organisation of Islamic Cooperation, the Caribbean Community, the Union of South American Nations, and many other international organisations. Although English is not de jure an official language at the national level in the United States, most states and territories within the United States have English as an official language, and only Puerto Rico uses a language other than English as a primary working language.

The United Kingdom, the United States, Australia, and New Zealand, where the overwhelming majority of native English speakers reside, do not have English as an official language de jure, but English is considered their de facto official language because it dominates in these countries.

Sovereign states

Non-sovereign entities
{| class="wikitable sortable plainrowheaders"
|+ Non-sovereign entities where English is a de jure official language
|-
!scope="col"| Entity
!scope="col"| Sovereign state
!scope="col"| Region
!scope="col"| Population'!scope="col"| Primary language?
|-
!scope="row"| Akrotiri and Dhekelia
| United Kingdom
| Europe
| style="text-align:right;"| 15,700
| No
|-
!scope="row"| American Samoa
| United States
| Oceania
| style="text-align:right;"| 67,700
| No (official language)
|-
!scope="row"| Anguilla
| United Kingdom
| Caribbean
| style="text-align:right;"| 18,090
| No (English-based creole language)
|-
!scope="row"| Bermuda
| United Kingdom
| North America
| style="text-align:right;"| 65,000
| Yes
|-
!scope="row"| British Virgin Islands
| United Kingdom
| Caribbean
| style="text-align:right;"| 23,000
| No (English-based creole language)
|-
!scope="row"| Cayman Islands
| United Kingdom
| Caribbean
| style="text-align:right;"| 47,000
| Yes (English-based creole language)
|-
!scope="row"| Cook Islands
| New Zealand
| Oceania
| style="text-align:right;"| 20,000
| No
|-
!scope="row"| Curaçao
| Netherlands
| Caribbean
| style="text-align:right;"| 150,563
| No
|-
!scope="row"| Falkland Islands
| United Kingdom
| South America
| style="text-align:right;"| 3,000
| Yes
|-
!scope="row"| Gibraltar
| United Kingdom
| Europe
| style="text-align:right;"| 33,000
| Yes
|-
!scope="row"| Guam
| United States
| Oceania
| style="text-align:right;"| 173,000
| Yes (co-official with Chamorro) 
|-
!scope="row"| Hong Kong
| China
| Asia
| style="text-align:right;"| 7,097,600
| No (but de jure and de facto co-official with Chinese)
|-
!scope="row"| Isle of Man
| United Kingdom
| Europe
| style="text-align:right;"| 80,058
| Yes
|-
!scope="row"| Jersey
| United Kingdom
| Europe
| style="text-align:right;"| 89,300
| Yes
|-
!scope="row"| Niue
| New Zealand
| Oceania
| style="text-align:right;"| 1,600
| No
|-
!scope="row"| Norfolk Island
| Australia
| Oceania
| style="text-align:right;"| 1,828
| No (English-based creole language)
|-
!scope="row"| Northern Mariana Islands
| United States
| Oceania
| style="text-align:right;"| 53,883
| Yes (co-official with Chamorro)
|-
!scope="row"| Pitcairn Islands
| United Kingdom
| Oceania
| style="text-align:right;"| 50
| Yes
|-
!scope="row"| Puerto Rico
| United States
| Caribbean
| style="text-align:right;"| 3,991,000
| No (co-official with Spanish as the primary language)
|-
!scope="row"| Rotuma
| Fiji
| Oceania
| style="text-align:right;"| 1,594
| No
|-
!scope="row"| Sint Maarten
| Netherlands
| Caribbean
| style="text-align:right;"| 40,900
| No (English-based creole language)
|-
!scope="row"| Turks and Caicos Islands
| United Kingdom
| Caribbean
| style="text-align:right;"| 26,000
| No (English-based creole language)
|-
!scope="row"| U.S. Virgin Islands
| United States
| Caribbean
| style="text-align:right;"| 111,000
| No (English-based creole language)
|}

Country subdivisions
In these country subdivisions, English has de jure'' official status, but English is not official in their respective countries at the national level.

See also

English-only movement
Anglo-America
Commonwealth of Nations
Member states of the Commonwealth of Nations
British Overseas Territories
English-speaking world
List of countries by English-speaking population
List of languages by total number of speakers
British Empire

Footnotes
 The population figures are based on the sources in List of countries by population, with information as of 23 January 2009 (UN estimates, et al.), and refer to the population of the country and not necessarily to the number of inhabitants that speak English in the country in question.
Hong Kong is a former British Crown colony (1843–1981) and British Dependent Territory (1981–1997); it is currently a Special Administrative Region of the People's Republic of China (1997–present).
Puerto Rico is, historically and culturally, connected to the Spanish-speaking Caribbean; Spanish is also an official language on the island. Puerto Rico is an unincorporated United States territory referred to as a "Commonwealth".
Guam is an organized unincorporated territory of the United States
The US Virgin Islands is an insular area of the United States.
Jersey is a British Crown dependency.
The Northern Mariana Islands is a commonwealth in political union with the United States.
The Isle of Man is a British Crown dependency.
Bermuda is a British Overseas Territory.
Guernsey is a British Crown dependency.
American Samoa is an unincorporated U.S. territory.
Christmas Island is an external territory of Australia.
Pitcairn Islands is a British Overseas Territory.
The Cook Islands and Niue are associated states of New Zealand that lack general recognition.
Cocos (Keeling) Islands is an external territory of Australia.

References

English-only movement

English as a global language
English as an official language